Abdel-Wahed El-Sayed Abdel-Wahed Masoud is an Egyptian retired footballer who played as a goalkeeper.

Honors

Club
Zamalek
 Egyptian Premier League (3): 2000–01, 2002–03, 2003–04
 Egyptian Super Cup (2): 2001, 2002
 Egypt Cup (5): 1998–99, 2001–02, 2007–08, 2013, 2014
 African Cup Winners' Cup (1): 2000
 African Champions League (1): 2002
 African Super Cup (1): 2003
 Afro-Asian Club Championship (1): 1997
 Arab Club Championship Title (1): 2003
 Egyptian Saudi Super Cup (1): 2003

International
 African Cup of Nations (2): 2006, 2010

Individual
 Best Egyptian Goal Keeper in 2003.
 Best Goal Keeper in Africa in 2002 CAF Champions League.

References

1977 births
Living people
Egyptian footballers
Egypt international footballers
2009 FIFA Confederations Cup players
2000 African Cup of Nations players
2004 African Cup of Nations players
2006 Africa Cup of Nations players
2010 Africa Cup of Nations players
Zamalek SC players
Misr Lel Makkasa SC players
Association football goalkeepers
Egyptian Premier League players
People from Monufia Governorate